The 2012 FC Kairat season was the 2nd successive season that the club playing in the Kazakhstan Premier League, the highest tier of association football in Kazakhstan, since their promotion back to the top flight in 2009. Kairat finished the season in 10th place and reached the Second Round of the Kazakhstan Cup.

Squad

Transfers

Winter

In:

Out:

Summer

In:

Out:

Competitions

Kazakhstan Premier League

Results summary

Results by round

Results

League table

Kazakhstan Cup

Squad statistics

Appearances and goals

|-
|colspan="14"|Players away from Kairat on loan:

|-
|colspan="14"|Players who appeared for Kairat that left during the season:

|}

Goal scorers

Disciplinary record

References

External links
Official Site

Kairat
FC Kairat seasons